Greenup is a home rule-class city located at the confluence of the Little Sandy River with the Ohio River in Greenup County, Kentucky,  United States. The population was 1,188 at the 2010 census. Greenup is one of three county seats in the Commonwealth of Kentucky to share its name with its county; the other two being Harlan and Henderson.

Greenup is a part of the Huntington-Ashland, WV-KY-OH Metropolitan Statistical Area (MSA). As of the 2010 census, the MSA had a population of 287,702.

History
Greenup was laid out in 1803 and 1804 by Robert Johnson, a pioneer and legislator who owned the land. Upon the formation of Greenup County (named for the former congressman  Christopher Greenup, who later served as governor) out of land separated from Mason County, Johnson's settlement was chosen to be the seat of government and adopted the name "Greenupsburg". Its post office was erected on July 1, 1811. The state assembly formally established the town on February 4, 1818, and incorporated the city thirty years later on February 29, 1848. The name was shortened to "Greenup" on March 13, 1872, partially to avoid confusion with Greensburg. 

Around 1865 the Eastern Kentucky Railway Company established its headquarters, rail yard, and depot at Riverton or eastern Greenup.

The Ohio River flood of 1937 brought devastation to Greenup and many other towns along the river. Some people left the area permanently, with the population of Greenup showing a decline of 5.5% in the 1940 census.

Geography

Greenup is located in eastern Greenup County at  (38.573503, -82.833549), along the south bank of the Ohio River. The northeast boundary of the city follows the Ohio–Kentucky border within the river. The Little Sandy River forms most of the western boundary of the city, except for a small portion of the city that extends west across the river between Seaton Avenue and Main Street.

U.S. Route 23 (Seaton Avenue) runs through the southwest side of the city, leading northwest  to Portsmouth, Ohio and southeast  to Ashland, Kentucky. Kentucky Route 1 leads south  to Grayson, and Kentucky Route 2 leads southwest  to Olive Hill.

Government

The city of Greenup has a mayor–council form of government. The city's current mayor is Lundie Meadows. Its representative body is the city council, which has six members elected from single-member districts.

Public safety
Greenup is protected by its own police and fire departments. In addition, surrounding fire and police departments are in a mutual aid agreement with the city of Greenup. Also, the Greenup County Sheriff's Department offices are located in the Greenup County Courthouse in Downtown Greenup. Emergency medical service is provided by Greenup County Emergency Medical Services.

Greenup Fire Department (Station 70) is located at 1110 Walnut Street. 
Greenup Police Department is located in the city's municipal building located at 1005 Walnut Street.
Greenup County Emergency Medical Service operates a station on U.S. 23 in Greenup.

Demographics

As of the census of 2000, there were 1,198 people, 478 households, and 321 families residing in the city. The racial makeup of the city was 90.07% White, 8.85% African American, 0.25% Native American, 0.17% Asian, 0.17% from other races, and 0.50% from two or more races. Hispanic or Latino of any race were 0.75% of the population.

There were 478 households, out of which 24.3% had children under the age of 18 living with them, 54.0% were married couples living together, 11.7% had a female householder with no husband present, and 32.8% were non-families. 31.0% of all households were made up of individuals, and 17.2% had someone living alone who was 65 years of age or older. The average household size was 2.27 and the average family size was 2.83.

In the city the population was spread out, with 18.5% under the age of 18, 10.2% from 18 to 24, 30.1% from 25 to 44, 22.8% from 45 to 64, and 18.4% who were 65 years of age or older. The median age was 39 years. For every 100 females, there were 96.4 males. For every 100 females age 18 and over, there were 94.0 males.

The median income for a household in the city was $33,158, and the median income for a family was $41,548. Males had a median income of $33,750 versus $23,036 for females. The per capita income for the city was $15,926. About 6.2% of families and 10.7% of the population were below the poverty line, including 10.7% of those under age 18 and 12.1% of those age 65 or over.

Education
The main branch of the Greenup County Public Library is located in downtown Greenup.

Notable people
 W. Terry McBrayer, Kentucky state legislator and lawyer
 Clint Thomas, baseball player in the Negro leagues

See also
 List of cities and towns along the Ohio River

References

External links
 City of Greenup official website

Cities in Greenup County, Kentucky
County seats in Kentucky
Populated places established in 1818
Kentucky populated places on the Ohio River
Cities in Kentucky